Wim Van Diest (born 2 March 1977) is a Belgian footballer currently playing for Excelsior Veldwezelt. He played in the Jupiler League for Lommel

References

1977 births
Living people
Belgian footballers
K.F.C. Dessel Sport players
K.F.C. Lommel S.K. players
Association football midfielders
K.F.C. Diest players
People from Herk-de-Stad
Footballers from Limburg (Belgium)